The Thinking Man's Trombone is an album by trombonist Al Grey released in 1960 on Argo Records.

Reception 

The Allmusic review by Scott Yanow stated: "A boppish trombonist who was a master at using the plunger mute (crossing over into swing), Grey holds his own on this set ... Swinging and witty music".

Track listing 
 "Salty Papa" (Al Grey) – 5:50
 "Don't Cry Baby" (James P. Johnson, Saul Bernie, Stella Unger) – 2:24
 "Stranded" (Frank Foster) – 5:30
 "Rompin'" (Foster) – 4:00
 "King Bee" (Al Grey) – 6:14
 "When I Fall in Love" (Victor Young) – 2:32
 "Al-amo" (Thad Jones) – 5:25
 "Tenderly" (Walter Gross, Jack Lawrence) – 2:24

Personnel 
Al Grey – trombone, bandleader
Joe Newman – trumpet
Benny Powell – trombone
Billy Mitchell – tenor saxophone
Charlie Fowlkes – baritone saxophone
Eddie Higgins – piano (tracks 1-7)
Freddie Green – guitar (tracks 1-7)
Ed Jones – bass (tracks 1-7)
Sonny Payne – drums (tracks 1-7)

References 

1960 albums
Al Grey albums
Argo Records albums